In algebra, a linear Lie algebra is a subalgebra  of the Lie algebra  consisting of endomorphisms of a vector space V. In other words, a linear Lie algebra is the image of a Lie algebra representation.

Then V is semisimple as a module over  if and only if (i) it is a direct sum of the center and a semisimple ideal and (ii) the elements of the center are diagonalizable (over some extension field).

Notes

References 
 

Lie algebras